Cunda may refer to:

Cunda Kammāraputta, a character associated with Gautama Buddha
Cunda Island (Alibey Island), island in Ayvalık, Turkey

See also
Kunda (disambiguation)
 Miguel Angel Lavié da Cunda, Uruguayan footballer